The Commonwealth Party was a political party in Gibraltar. It was the first party to contest an election after the Association for the Advancement of Civil Rights (AACR) and was led by Juan Jose Triay.

History
The party was founded in 1953. The party won a seat in the 1956 general elections, taken by Triay. In the elections to the City Council, three months later (on 5 December 1956) the Commonwealth Party got two out of ten seats, for Guy Stagnetto and Louis Bruzon (besides 5 for the AACR, and 3 independents).

However, in 1957 Triay resigned from the Legislative Council in protest at the silence adopted by the other members of the council on the Spanish visa restrictions issue. In the by-election, the Commonwealth Party candidate, Alfred Vasquez was not elected and the party disbanded.

References

External links 
When elections were not contested.

Defunct political parties in Gibraltar
Political parties established in 1953
1953 establishments in Gibraltar
Political parties disestablished in 1957